Charles William Read (May 12, 1840 – January 25, 1890), known commonly as "Savez", was an officer in the antebellum United States Navy and then in the Confederate Navy during the American Civil War. He was nicknamed the "Seawolf of the Confederacy" for his exploits and daring.

Early life and career
Charles William Read was born in Satartia, Mississippi in 1840.  He was appointed to the United States Naval Academy in 1856 and graduated in 1860. He served briefly aboard USS Powhatan after graduation.

American Civil War
At the outbreak of the American Civil War Read resigned his commission with the United States Navy and accepted a position with the Confederate States Navy. On October 12, 1861, he participated in the attack on the Union blockading squadron at Head of the Passes on the Mississippi River. When the commander of the CSS McRae was wounded on April 24, 1862, Read took command of the ship.

Read then served as executive officer of the  during its actions against a blockading fleet of over 30 ships on the Mississippi River near Vicksburg, Mississippi on 13 July 1862. Read served as acting commander of the Arkansas during her final battle supporting the Confederate Army assaulting Baton Rouge, Louisiana on 6 August 1862. After the sinking of the Arkansas, Read travelled by foot to Port Hudson, Louisiana and assisted with the emplacement of shore guns there.

At the end of the raid, Lieutenant Read had captured or destroyed twenty-two United States vessels. Read was held at Fort Warren, Massachusetts, until he was exchanged at Cox Wharf, Virginia, on October 18, 1864.

Read did not reach the Webb until 22 April 1865. Read attempted to break out to the Gulf of Mexico but grounded in shallow waters near New Orleans on April 23, 1865. Read fired the ship to prevent its capture by Federal forces. Read surrendered to Federal naval authorities in New Orleans and was transported again to Fort Warren. He was released on July 24, 1865.

Later life
In 1867, Read was second officer aboard a ship involved in an effort to help Cuban rebels overthrow the Spanish government of the island. Read and others were arrested by the US government but were quickly released.

He was later hired by Charles Flynt to train Peru in the use of torpedoes. Read was commissioned as an Commander in the Peruvian Navy and much like John Randolph Tucker, received disdain from within the Peruvian Navy due to their jealousy of a foreigner being hired in a position of command.

Read earned his nickname "Savvy" or "Savez" due to his constant use of the term.

Charles Read died at Meridian, Mississippi, where he is buried.

See also
Commerce raiding

References

Further reading
 Campbell, R. Thomas, Sea Hawk of the Confederacy: Lt. Charles W. Read and the Confederate Navy, 
 Jones, Robert A., Confederate Corsair: The Life of Lt. Charles W. "Savez" Read, 
 Shaw, David W., Sea Wolf of the Confederacy: The Daring Civil War Raids of Naval Lt. Charles W. Read

External links 

 
 Charles Read at Historical Marker Database

1840 births
1890 deaths
American Civil War prisoners of war
Confederate States Navy officers
People from Meridian, Mississippi
United States Navy officers